A Husband for Anna is a 1953 Italian romance-drama film directed by Giuseppe De Santis.

Cast 

Silvana Pampanini: Anna Zaccheo 
Amedeo Nazzari: Dr. Illuminato 
Massimo Girotti: Andrea Grazzi 
Umberto Spadaro: Don Antonio Percucoco 
Monica Clay: Miss Illuminato 
Anna Galasso: Miss Zaccheo  
Giovanni Berardi: Mr. Zaccheo 
Enrico Glori: Proprietario del cinema 
Enzo Maggio: Photographer

References

External links

dvd of the film

1953 films
1953 romantic drama films
Italian romantic drama films
Films directed by Giuseppe De Santis
Films with screenplays by Cesare Zavattini
1950s Italian films